Rock Creek is a free-flowing tributary of the Potomac River that empties into the Atlantic Ocean via the Chesapeake Bay. Its final quarter-mile (400 m) is affected by tides.

Geography

Course 

The creek rises from a culvert under Dorsey Road at the north edge of Laytonsville Golf Course in Montgomery County, Maryland.  A dam forms a small lake near its source.  After exiting the golf course, Rock Creek flows between residential developments until it meets Agricultural History Farm Park, where the Upper Rock Creek Trail starts.  It flows underneath the Intercounty Connector, which crosses it on a large arch bridge visible from the trail.

It then flows into Lake Needwood at Rock Creek Regional Park in Maryland's Derwood–Rockville area.  South of the Lake Needwood Dam, Rock Creek flows in a deep gorge and is paralleled by the main Rock Creek Trail, and is joined by the North Branch Rock Creek.  It exits the gorge near the Twinbrook neighborhood of Rockville and the Parklawn Memorial Cemetery.

At North Kensington, Beach Drive begins to parallel the creek. The creek eventually crosses the Capital Beltway and later reaches the Washington, D.C., border.

The creek flows for about  through Rock Creek Park in Washington, where it is fed by several small creeks (Piney Branch, Pinehurst Branch, Broad Branch, Soapstone Branch, and Luzon Branch) and numerous storm sewers.

The Chesapeake and Ohio Canal joins Rock Creek in Georgetown; the creek's mouth is the canal's eastern terminus. Just below this confluence, the Canal Company in 1831 completed a mole, causeway, and waste weir. This area, which the company dubbed "Rock Creek Basin", silted up and was dredged several times for the Canal's use. The creek (and the canal) empty into the Potomac River at the Tidewater Lock near the Watergate complex.

Watershed 
About 21 percent of the creek's watershed is in Washington. The creek has a fairly steep gradient, with rapid changes in elevation. The man-made Lake Needwood is located on the creek, north of Rockville.

The conditions at the Rock Creek are monitored by the USGS.

Water quality and restoration

In Maryland, most of the northern Rock Creek watershed has good to excellent water quality, according to studies conducted by the county government. In 2004, to preserve water quality in partially developed areas, the county imposed restrictions on development (i.e., designation of "Special Protection Areas") in parts of this sub-watershed. The southern portion of the Maryland watershed is highly urbanized. Most of this portion of the creek and its tributaries have poor water quality. As of 2018 the county has completed several stream restoration projects throughout the watershed, and has additional projects planned or under construction.

The D.C. segment of Rock Creek also has poor water quality.  In addition to typical urban stormwater pollution problems such as runoff from streets and other impervious surfaces, the creek has high bacteria levels due to leaking sewer pipes and combined sewer overflows (CSOs). The D.C. government, which has a stormwater discharge permit from the United States Environmental Protection Agency, is improving its stormwater management to raise water quality in Rock Creek. In 2009, the District of Columbia Water and Sewer Authority began a planned two-year effort to replace portions of the combined sewer with separate storm sewers, and so eliminate CSO-related problems in the creek.

As of 2021, the bacteria levels in the creek remained dangerously high due to the leaking sewer pipes, even during dry weather, and the public has been warned not to wade into the creek.

Fish species observed in Rock Creek and its tributaries include eastern blacknose dace, bluntnose minnow, yellow bullhead, satinfin shiner, swallowtail shiner, longnose dace, and American eel.

Restoration projects

In 2006, the National Park Service finished a project to remove or bypass eight fish barriers in the creek by adding a fish ladder to bypass the 1905 Peirce Mill Dam, modifying historic fords, and removing abandoned sewage lines and fords. The effort is designed to restore American shad, river herring, and other migratory fish to the creek and their historic upriver spawning grounds. An estimated two million fish migrate up the creek each year.

The D.C. government completed a restoration project on the Milkhouse Run and Bingham Run tributaries in 2013. As of 2014, ongoing restoration projects in the watershed include the Broad Branch and Klingle Run tributaries.

Tributaries
(Listed in order from the mouth upstream)

In D.C.
Dumbarton Oaks
Normanstone Creek
Klingle Valley Creek (also called Klingle Creek, Klingle Run)
Piney Branch
Melvin Hazen Valley Branch
Broad Branch
Soapstone Branch
Luzon Branch
Milkhouse Run
Bingham Run
Pinehurst Branch
Fenwick Branch
Portal Branch

In Maryland
Donnybrook Tributary
Coquelin Run
Capitol View Tributary
Kensington Heights Branch
Stoney Creek
Alta Vista Tributary (formerly Bethesda Run)
Luxmanor Branch
Stoneybrook Tributary
Josephs Branch
Turkey Branch
Sycamore Creek
Croydon Park Tributary
Southlawn Branch
Williamsburg Run
North Branch (Lake Bernard Frank)
Lake Needwood (in-line on Rock Creek)
Crabbs Branch
Mill Creek
Pope Farm Branch
Airpark Road Branch

See also

List of crossings of Rock Creek
List of rivers of Washington, D.C.
List of rivers of Maryland
Rock Creek and Potomac Parkway
Tidewater Lock

References

External links
 Montgomery County:
 Overview of Rock Creek Watershed
 Rock Creek Watershed Implementation Plan (2012) - Stormwater management
 Rock Creek Park:
 Environmental Inventory & Monitoring
 Volunteer stewardship organization:
 Rock Creek Conservancy

 
Rivers of Washington, D.C.
Rivers of Maryland
Tributaries of the Potomac River
Rivers of Montgomery County, Maryland
Rock Creek and Potomac Parkway
Rock Creek Park